The 900 class were a class of diesel locomotives built by Islington Railway Workshops for the South Australian Railways between 1951 and 1953.

History
The 900 class were the first main line diesels operated by the South Australian Railways. Ten were built at Islington Railway Workshops to replace steam locomotives on the heavily graded Mount Lofty Ranges. They operated both heavy freight trains and passenger services including The Overland. After the arrival of more powerful diesels, they were concentrated on the easier graded lines from Adelaide to Port Pirie and Peterborough.

In March 1978, all were included in the transfer of the South Australian Railways to Australian National. Withdrawals commenced in May 1979 with the last two withdrawn on 18 June 1985 after operating a cement train from Angaston to Dry Creek. Three have been preserved with the other seven scrapped.

Preserved
Three units have been preserved:
900 Lady Norrie resides at the National Railway Museum, Port Adelaide
907 resides in Tailem Bend under private ownership in derelict condition
909 resides in Tailem Bend under private ownership being standard gauge converted and in operational condition

References

English Electric brochure TD120 https://www.flickr.com/photos/29903115@N06/6747430491

A1A-A1A locomotives
Railway locomotives introduced in 1951
900
Broad gauge locomotives in Australia
5 ft 3 in gauge locomotives
Diesel-electric locomotives of Australia
English Electric locomotives
Streamlined diesel locomotives